The Craig Vetter Fuel Economy Challenge is a motorcycle fuel efficiency contest created in 1980 by motorcycle fairing inventor Craig Vetter. The contest was cited in Vetter's Motorcycle Hall of Fame induction.

The contest initially ran from 1980 to 1985, with the inaugural run from Colorado Springs to Cripple Creek, Colorado. After a 25-year break, the contest resumed from 2011 with revised Vetter Fuel Challenge rules allowing for alternative fuel categories and requiring street usability including goods-carrying capability. This is considered a particularly important future need for electric motorcycles like the Zero, where battery constraints limit usable range, and the need for lengthy recharging cycles at public electrical points punctuates journeys and necessitates careful trip planning.

A streamlined motorcycle designed by Charly Perethian with a 185 cc Yamaha motor achieved  at the 1983 challenge, and is now displayed in the Smithsonian Institution.

Results
Winners by year are tabulated below. Data as published by Craig Vetter at the contest website. All vehicles are full faired streamliners unless noted.

Results from the 2010s can not be directly compared as there was a major rule change that required a minimum cargo capacity and minimum top speed. Additionally, winners were declared by cost spent on pump gas (or electricity), not strictly mileage, significant as there is a mix of motor types.

Craig Vetter hit a deer while riding his stream-lined Honda Helix on August 14, 2015. To help him stay focused on his recovery, volunteers helped coordinate and document the 2015 and 2016 Vetter Challenge Rides in Ohio.

Pictures of Winning Vehicles:

References

External links

Motorcycle rallies in the United States
Fuel economy challenge
1980 establishments in the United States
Energy conservation in the United States
Motorsport competitions in the United States